Tang (Chinese: 唐, mandarin Pinyin:  Táng; Japanese: 唐/とう/から; Korean: 당/唐; Cantonese : Tong; Wade–Giles: Dang), is a Chinese surname. The three languages also have the surname with the same character but different pronunciation/romanization. In Korean, it is usually romanized also as Dang. In Japanese, the surname is often romanized as To. In Vietnamese, it is commonly written as Đường (the anglicized variation is Duong, not be confused with Vietnamese surname Dương which is also anglicized as Duong). It is pronounced dhɑng in Middle Chinese, and lhāŋ in Old Chinese. It is the 64th name on the Hundred Family Surnames poem.

The surname 唐 is also romanized as Tong when transliterated from Cantonese, and this spelling is common in Hong Kong and Macau. In Chinese, 湯 (Pinyin: Tāng), is also romanized as Tang in English (and also Tong in Cantonese), although it is less common as a surname.

Distribution
Tang is a very common surname in southern China. Of the top 30 cities in China, 唐 ranked 10th most common surname in the city of Chongqing.

History
People with this surname mainly have three originations:
 From the clan name Tao-Tang (or Taotang, Tao Tang)
 Tao-Tang was the clan name  for Emperor Yao's tribe, so Yao is also known as Tang Yao (唐堯/唐尧) or Tang Fangxun (唐放勛/唐放勋) (Fangxun literally means great meritorious service or contribution). Tao means pottery, which was a very important invention and tool in ancient China; Tang was the ancient name for the place currently is part of central China and the central plain of Shanxi Province. Yao's tribe combined the names of pottery and their resident place as their clan name . The descendants of Yao continued using the surname Tang instead of Tao-Tang, probably for simplification purpose.
 From the King Tang Shuyu
 In the early Zhou dynasty (Western Zhou), when the King Cheng of Zhou was still a child, one day he played a game with his young brother Tang Shuyu. The King Cheng of Zhou cut a tung leaf to a Jade Gui (Chinese: 玉珪, a kind of jade article representing authority and trust) shape, sent to Tang Shuyu, and said: you are raised to the Marquis of Tang (Chinese: 唐侯, Tang here stands for the same place as mentioned above). The chancellor aside immediately advised the King Cheng of Zhou to choose an auspicious day and make a royal ceremony for establishing Tang Shuyu. The King Cheng of Zhou was surprised, and said, "We are just playing a game and I just made a joke." The chancellor replied: the King cannot make a joke, once the King speaks out, historians record his words, the loyal ceremony will be held, and the loyal music will be played." Thus Tang Shuyu was raised to the Marquis of Tang, and later became the first king of Jin. It's a famous historic event and the origin for the Chinese phrase Tongye Fenghou (Chinese: 桐叶封侯). His offspring continued using Tang as their surname.
 From South China's aboriginal tribes
 Many native tribes in southern China adopted this surname from Chinese immigrants from central China throughout the history.

Chinese Muslims
Unlike some other Hui people who claim foreign ancestry, Hui in Gansu with the surname "Tang" 唐, are descended from Han Chinese who converted to Islam and married Muslim Hui or Dongxiang people, switching their ethnicity and joining the Hui and Dongxiang ethnic groups, both of which are Muslim.

A town called Tangwangchuan (唐汪川) in Gansu had a multi ethnic populace, the Tang 唐 and Wang (surname) 汪 families being the two major families. The Tang and Wang families were originally of non Muslim Han Chinese extraction, but by the 1910s some branches of the families became Muslim by "intermarriage or conversion" while other branches of the families remained non Muslim.

Notable people
 Agnes Hsu-Tang, American archaeologist, art historian, and philanthropist
Tang Jian (579–656), Chinese official
 Tang Yin (1470–1524), Chinese scholar, painter, calligrapher, and poet
 Tang Zhen (1630–1704), Chinese philosopher and educator
 Tang Tingshu (1832–1892), Chinese comprador, interpreter, and businessman
 Tang Jingsong (1841–1903), Chinese general and statesman
 Tang Shaoyi (1862–1938), Chinese politician, first Premier of the Republic of China, 1912
 Tang Jiyao (1883–1927), Chinese general and warlord of Yunnan
 Tang Shengzhi (1889–1970): Chinese warlord and politician
 Tang Junyi (1909–1978), Chinese philosopher
 Tang Kesan, Chinese Muslim Kuomintang politician and educator
 Tang Ti-sheng (1917–1959), Cantonese opera playwright, scriptwriter, and film director
 Tang Fei (born 1933), general and Premier of the Republic of China, 2000
 Tang Jiaxuan (born 1938), foreign minister of the People's Republic of China, 1998–2003
 Stephen Tong (born 1940), Chinese-Indonesian Reformed pastor, teacher and musician
 Tang Shu Shuen (born 1941), former Hong Kong film director
 Henry Tang (born 1952), Hong Kong politician
 Tang Guoqiang (born 1952), Chinese actor
 Danson Tang (born 1984), Taiwanese model, actor and singer
Oscar Tang, American financier

Fictional characters
Tang Shen, a minor supporting character in the Teenage Mutant Ninja Turtles franchise, who had died prior to each version of the show; namely the 2D 2003 series and the 3D CG 2012 show. Although mentioned/referenced several times, she is even shown only in flashbacks and/or photographs.
Trixie Tang, a recurring character in ongoing Nickelodeon's The FairlyOdd Parents.

References

See also
 Tang dynasty (唐)
 State of Tang, later renamed Jin
 Tāng (surname) (汤/湯)

Chinese-language surnames
Individual Chinese surnames